Lose may refer to:

Lose (Cymbals Eat Guitars album), the third studio album by American indie rock band Cymbals Eat Guitars
"Lose" (song), by KSI and Lil Wayne, 2021
"Lose", a song by Travis Scott from his 2016 album Birds in the Trap Sing McKnight
League of Super Evil, a Canadian animated television series produced by Nerd Corps Entertainment in conjunction with YTV
Lightweight Oxygen Swimmers Equipment, a diving rebreather formerly made by Siebe Gorman, similar to a Swimmer Canoeist's Breathing Apparatus

See also
Lose/Lose, 2009 art video game
 Loser (disambiguation)
 Losing (disambiguation)
 Loss (disambiguation)